The Uzbek Soviet Encyclopedia is the largest and most comprehensive encyclopedia in the Uzbek language, comprising 14 volumes. It is the first general-knowledge encyclopedia in Uzbek. 

The Uzbek Soviet Encyclopedia was printed in the Cyrillic script. Although the encyclopedia contained some articles translated from the Russian-language Great Soviet Encyclopedia, its coverage of topics skewed towards Uzbek interests.

History 
The Uzbek Soviet Encyclopedia was published in Tashkent from 1971 to 1980 by the Uzbek Soviet Encyclopedia Publishing House. Doctor Ibrohim Moʻminov, a member of the Academy of Sciences of Uzbekistan, was the chief editor of volumes one through nine. Komiljon Zufarov was the chief editor of volumes ten through fourteen. The Uzbek Soviet Encyclopedia was not available in Russian.

Content 
The Uzbek Soviet Encyclopedia is a comprehensive source of knowledge in social and economic studies and in the applied sciences. A major value of the encyclopedia is its comprehensive information about the USSR in general and the Uzbek SSR in particular. Every aspect of life in Soviet Uzbekistan is systematically presented, including history, economy, science, art, and culture. There are comprehensive biographies of prominent Uzbek cultural and scientific figures who are not as well known outside of Uzbekistan.

The Uzbek Soviet Encyclopedia contains extensive writings on Sufism, and generally positive coverage of Uzbek Sufi philosophers such as Khoja Akhmet Yassawi. The encyclopedia initially criticized anti-Soviet writers such as Abdulrauf Fitrat and Choʻlpon as bourgeois nationalists, but these figures were rehabilitated during glasnost.

See also 
 Great Soviet Encyclopedia
 National Encyclopedia of Uzbekistan

References 

Soviet culture
Uzbek-language literature
Uzbek-language encyclopedias
Uzbek Soviet Socialist Republic
1971 non-fiction books
20th-century encyclopedias
National Soviet encyclopedias